Sabael is a hamlet in the town of Indian Lake, Hamilton County, New York, United States. Sabael had a post office until March 9, 2013; it still has its own ZIP code, 12864.

References

Hamlets in Hamilton County, New York
Hamlets in New York (state)